Alberto Guerrero (10 October 1903 – 20 November 1988) was a Puerto Rican sports shooter. He competed at the 1952 Summer Olympics and 1968 Summer Olympics.

References

1903 births
1988 deaths
Puerto Rican male sport shooters
Olympic shooters of Puerto Rico
Shooters at the 1952 Summer Olympics
Shooters at the 1968 Summer Olympics
People from Humacao, Puerto Rico
Pan American Games medalists in shooting
Pan American Games silver medalists for Puerto Rico
Shooters at the 1955 Pan American Games